Woptober II is the fourteenth studio album by American rapper Gucci Mane. It was released on October 18, 2019, by Atlantic Records and GUWOP Enterprises. The album features guest appearances from YoungBoy Never Broke Again, DaBaby, Megan Thee Stallion, Lil Baby, Kodak Black, London on da Track, Migos members Quavo and Takeoff, Peewee Longway, Kevin Gates, Yung Mal, OJ da Juiceman, among others. Production is handled by TM88, Southside, Metro Boomin, Lex Luger, and London on da Track, among others.

Singles
The album's lead single, "Richer Than Errybody", was released on September 13, 2019. The song features guest appearances from American rappers YoungBoy Never Broke Again and DaBaby, while the production was provided by Lex Luger.

The second single, "Big Booty", was released on October 4, 2019. The song features a guest appearance from American rapper Megan Thee Stallion and was produced by J. White Did It.

The album's third single, "Tootsies", was released on October 11, 2019. The song features American rapper Lil Baby and was produced by Quay Global.

The fourth and last single, "Big Boy Diamonds" was released with the album on October 18, 2019. The song features vocals from American rapper Kodak Black and American producer London on da Track and was produced by London on da Track.

Commercial performance
Woptober II debuted at number nine on the US Billboard 200 with 31,000 album-equivalent units (including 2,000 were pure album sales). It is Gucci Mane's seventh US top-10 album.

Track listing
Credits adapted from Tidal.

Notes
 "Big Boy Diamonds" features background vocals by Vaughn Biggs

Sample credits
 "Big Booty" contains a sample from "Hoochie Mama", written by Richard Evans, David Hobbs, Mark Ross, and Christopher Wongwon, as performed by 2 Live Crew.

Personnel
Credits adapted from Tidal.

Musicians
 Nick Seeley – keyboards , percussion 
 Metro Boomin – keyboards , programming 

Technical
 Amani Hernández – mixing , mixing assistant 
 Jaycen Joshua – mixing 
 DJ Riggins – mixing assistant 
 Jacob Richards – mixing assistant 
 Mike Seaberg – mixing assistant 
 Colin Leonard – mastering 
 Eddie "eMIX" Hernandez – engineering , mixing , recording , vocal engineering 
 Ethan Stevens – vocal engineering , mixing , recording 

Additional personnel
 Harmony Korine – photography

Charts

References

2019 albums
Gucci Mane albums
Albums produced by Lex Luger
Albums produced by J. White Did It
Albums produced by Metro Boomin
Albums produced by Tay Keith
Albums produced by London on da Track
Albums produced by Zaytoven
Albums produced by TM88
Albums produced by Honorable C.N.O.T.E.
Albums produced by Southside (record producer)
Sequel albums